Bulgaria participated in the Eurovision Song Contest 2008 with the song "DJ, Take Me Away" written by Dian Savov. The song was performed by the group Deep Zone and Balthazar. The Bulgarian broadcaster Bulgarian National Television (BNT) organised the national final EuroBGvision in order to select the Bulgarian entry for the 2008 contest in Belgrade, Serbia. A total of 63 entries were selected to participate in the national final which consisted of five shows: three quarter-finals, a semi-final and a final, where "DJ, Take Me Away" performed by Deep Zone and Balthazar eventually emerged as the winning entry with 15.37% of the public televote.

Bulgaria was drawn to compete in the second semi-final of the Eurovision Song Contest which took place on 22 May 2008. Performing during the show in position 12, "DJ, Take Me Away" was not announced among the 10 qualifying entries of the second semi-final and therefore did not qualify to compete in the final. It was later revealed that Bulgaria placed eleventh out of the 19 participating countries in the semi-final with 56 points.

Background 

The nation achieved their best result in the contest in 2007 with the song "Water" performed by Elitsa Todorova and Stoyan Yankoulov, which qualified to the final and placed fifth. To this point, their 2007 entry is also the only Bulgarian entry to have qualified to the Eurovision final; the nation had failed to qualify to the final with their other two entries.

The Bulgarian national broadcaster, Bulgarian National Television (BNT), broadcasts the event within Bulgaria and organises the selection process for the nation's entry. BNT confirmed Bulgaria's participation in the 2008 Eurovision Song Contest on 29 June 2007. Since 2005, the broadcaster has organised a national final in order to select the Bulgarian entry for the competition, a selection procedure that continued for their 2008 entry.

Before Eurovision

EuroBGvision 
EuroBGvision was the national final format developed by BNT which determined the artist and song that would represent Bulgaria at the Eurovision Song Contest 2008. The competition consisted of three quarter-finals on 26 October 2007, 23 November 2007 and 21 December 2007, a semi-final on 26 January 2008 and a final on 23 February 2008, held at the National Palace of Culture in Sofia. All shows were hosted by Dragomir Draganov, Aksiniya Chenkova, Dani Georgiev and Niki Iliev and broadcast on Channel 1 as well as online via the broadcaster's website bnt.bg.

Format 
The three quarter-finals featured a total of 53 competing entries. Public televoting selected three entries from each quarter-final to advance to the semi-final, which were joined by an additional nine wildcards selected from the remaining non-qualifying acts of the quarter-finals and from newly submitted songs before the end of 2007. In the semi-final, the votes of a jury panel selected nine entries to advance to the final, which were joined by an additional three pre-qualified songs. In the final, the twelve competing entries were voted upon by the public in order to select the winner.

Competing entries 
On 29 June 2007, BNT opened a submission period for artists and songwriters to submit their entries until 26 September 2007. Songs were required to contain partial Bulgarian involvement. By the end of the deadline, the broadcaster received 56 eligible entries out of the 79 submitted. On 27 September 2007, the fifty-six artists and songs for the quarter-finals of the competition were announced. The 56 entries were allocated to one of three quarter-finals and the entries competing in each quarter-final were presented over three weekly presentation shows: between 7 and 21 October 2007 for the first quarter-final, between 3 and 18 November 2007 for the second quarter-final, and between 2 and 16 December 2007 for the third quarter-final. Prior to the first quarter-final, "Ne vyarvay" performed by Begacha and "Libe" performed by Dobromir Peev were withdrawn from the competition, while "Tseluni noshtta" performed by Katrin was disqualified.

On 1 October 2007, BNT opened an additional submission period until 21 December 2007 with 47 entries being received by the end of the deadline. On 22 December 2007, the artists of the additional four songs selected for the semi-final of the competition by a committee were announced: Ivaylo Kolev, Mariya Buchvarova featuring Van, Stoyan Royanov, and TE and Preslava Peycheva. An additional three entries came from artists internally selected by BNT and automatically qualified for the final of the competition: Desi Dobreva, Georgi Hristov and Gianni Fiorellino, and Nevena Tsoneva.

Shows

Quarter-finals 
The three quarter-finals took place on 26 October, 23 November and 21 December 2007. The three entries that qualified to the semi-final from each quarter-final were selected exclusively by public televoting, while an additional five entries were awarded the jury wildcards for the semi-final. In addition to the performances of the competing entries, the guest performer in the first quarter-final was Belarusian Eurovision Song Contest 2007 entrant Dmitry Koldun, while the StringS quartet, "Diva" Ballet Group and Bulgarian Junior Eurovision Song Contest 2007 entrant Bon-Bon performed as guests in the second quarter-final, and Petya Buyuklieva and Macedonian Eurovision Song Contest 2002 and 2007 entrant Karolina performed as guests in the third quarter-final.

Semi-final 
The semi-final took place on 26 January 2008. The fourteen quarter-final qualifiers alongside the four additional semi-finalists competed and nine entries qualified to the final based on the votes of a fifteen-person jury panel. In addition to the performances of the competing entries, guest performers were the three pre-qualified artists: Desi Dobreva, Georgi Hristov and Gianni Fiorellino, and Nevena Tsoneva. On 28 January 2008, "Sombero" performed by Stoyan Royanov which originally was selected to advance from the semi-final was disqualified from the competition after the song had been performed in June 2007 and replaced with "Tired Soul" performed by Vlado and Svetlio.

Final 
The final took place on 23 February 2008. The nine semi-final qualifiers along alongside the three automatic qualifiers competed and "DJ, Take Me Away" performed by Deep Zone and Balthazar was selected as the winner exclusively by public televoting. In addition to the performances of the competing entries, guest performers were Lili Ivanova, Mike Johnson, Ukrainian Eurovision Song Contest 2004 winner Ruslana and Bulgarian Eurovision Song Contest 2007 entrant Elitsa Todorova and Stoyan Yankoulov.

Promotion 
Deep Zone and Balthazar made several appearances across Europe to specifically promote "DJ, Take Me Away" as the Bulgarian Eurovision entry. Between 2 and 4 April, Deep Zone and Balthazar made radio and television appearances in Ukraine and performed at the Maidan Nezalezhnosti in Kyiv. On 14 April, the group appeared during the NET TV talk show programme Sellili in Malta. Between 18 and 20 April, the group took part in promotional activities in Turkey where they were interviewed by local media and appeared during shows on Mega Radio, ATV, MTV Turkey, Show TV and TRT. On 24 April, the artists appeared during the RTP1 talk show Portugal no Coração in Portugal. Deep Zone and Balthazar also took part in promotional activities in Greece and Romania, and completed promotional activities in Croatia on 12 May. In addition to their international appearances, Deep Zone and Balthazar performed during the annual BG Radio Music Awards which was held on 6 April at the National Palace of Culture in Sofia.

At Eurovision 
The Eurovision Song Contest 2008 took place at the Belgrade Arena in Belgrade, Serbia.  It consisted of two semi-finals held on 20 and 22 May, respectively, and the grand final on 24 May 2008. It was announced in September 2007 that the competition's format would be expanded to two semi-finals in 2008. According to Eurovision rules, all nations with the exceptions of the host country and the "Big Four" (France, Germany, Spain and the United Kingdom) are required to qualify from one of two semi-finals in order to compete for the final; the top nine songs from each semi-final as determined by televoting progress to the final, and a tenth was determined by back-up juries. The European Broadcasting Union (EBU) split up the competing countries into six different pots based on voting patterns from previous contests, with countries with favourable voting histories put into the same pot. On 28 January 2008, a special allocation draw was held which placed each country into one of the two semi-finals. Bulgaria was placed into the second semi-final, to be held on 22 May 2008. The running order for the semi-finals was decided through another draw on 17 March 2008 and Bulgaria was set to perform in position 12, following the entry from Croatia and before the entry from Denmark.

The two semi-finals and the final were broadcast in Bulgaria on Channel 1 with commentary by Elena Rosberg and Georgi Kushvaliev. The Bulgarian spokesperson, who announced the Bulgarian votes during the final, was Valentina Voykova.

Semi-final 

Deep Zone and Balthazar took part in technical rehearsals on 14 and 17 May, followed by dress rehearsals on 21 and 22 May. The Bulgarian performance featured the members of Deep Zone and Balthazar performing with guitar-shaped turntables which its disks were set alight on stage equipment cases at the end of the song. Lead singer Joanna Dragneva wore a red gown and held ostrich feathers. The other group members also performed vocals using vocoders. The stage colours were red and the LED screens displayed colourful elements. The performance also featured effects including green lasers and pyrotechnics. A breakdancer in a shirt with the number 12 joined Deep Zone and Balthazar on stage: Peter Kostov.

At the end of the show, Bulgaria was not announced among the top 10 entries in the second semi-final and therefore failed to qualify to compete in the final. It was later revealed that Bulgaria placed eleventh in the semi-final, receiving a total of 56 points.

Voting 
Below is a breakdown of points awarded to Bulgaria and awarded by Bulgaria in the second semi-final and grand final of the contest. The nation awarded its 12 points to Ukraine in the semi-final and to Germany in the final of the contest.

Points awarded to Bulgaria

Points awarded by Bulgaria

References

External links 
 EuroBGvision Website

2008
Countries in the Eurovision Song Contest 2008
Eurovision